James "Jimmi" Harkishin (born  Rajan Harkishindas; 19 March 1965) is an English actor best known for his role as shopkeeper Dev Alahan in Coronation Street, which he has played continuously since 10 November 1999. He also played Ranjit in the film Bhaji on the Beach (1993) and Iyaaz Ali Khan in East is East (1999). Harkishin played Gary Lobo in the Jonathan Creek episode "Danse Macabre".

Harkishin was born in Bangalore, India, to Sindhi parents, Gomomal and Vimla. He has three children, Holli Harkishin, Rajan Harkishin and India Rose Harkishin with partner Susan Beaton.

He began acting in 1986 under the stage name James Harkishin, and played the regular characters of Jose Cuervo for 18 episodes between 1990–1993 in the children's TV series Uncle Jack. He also  played Dr. Jay Rahman in the medical drama TV series Medics, appearing for 34 episodes between 1992 and 1995.

Filmography

Television

Film

Awards and nominations

References

External links
 

1965 births
Living people
British male soap opera actors
British male actors of South Asian descent
British people of Indian descent
British people of Italian descent
French people of Indian descent